Saussurea esthonica is a species of Saussurea.

It is native to Estonia and Latvia.

Synonym: Saussurea alpina subsp. esthonica (Rupr.) Kupffer.

References

esthonica
Flora of Europe